The World Group is the highest level of Fed Cup competition in 2019.

Participating teams 
{| class="wikitable" style="width:100%;"
|-
!colspan=4|Participating teams
|-
!style="width:25%;"| 
!style="width:25%;"| 
!style="width:25%;"| 
!style="width:25%;"| 
|-
!style="width:25%;"| 
!style="width:25%;"| 
!style="width:25%;"| 
!style="width:25%;"| 
|}

 Seeds 

 Draw

Quarterfinals

Czech Republic vs. Romania

Belgium vs. France

Germany vs. Belarus

United States vs. Australia

Semifinals

France vs. Romania

Australia vs. Belarus

Final

Australia vs. France

References 

World Group